Scopula transmeata is a moth of the  family Geometridae. It is found in Somalia.

References

Moths described in 1931
transmeata
Moths of Africa